The following is a list of the 57 episodes of the television show Paradise (later Guns of Paradise).

Series overview

Episodes

Season 1 (1988–89)

Season 2 (1989–90)

Season 3 (1991)

References

External links
 
 Paradise at www.tvguide.com

Paradise